Georg Köhl (19 November 1910 – 15 January 1944) was a German footballer who played as a goalkeeper for 1. FC Nürnberg and the Germany national team.

In 1939 he was drafted into the Wehrmacht to serve in the Second World War, seeing active service on the Eastern Front in Russia. He died in January 1944 in hospital in Krakow, Poland, from wounds received in action, having refused an amputation of his arm.

References

External links
 
 

1910 births
1944 deaths
Association football goalkeepers
German footballers
Germany international footballers
1. FC Nürnberg players
German military personnel killed in World War II
German Army soldiers of World War II
Footballers from Nuremberg